Helon Ollivierre (1881 – 23 February 1907) was a Trinidadian cricketer. He played in three first-class matches for Trinidad and Tobago from 1900 to 1904.

See also
 List of Trinidadian representative cricketers

References

External links
 

1881 births
1907 deaths
Trinidad and Tobago cricketers